James Alan "Jim" Kerzman (March 2, 1947 – June 20, 2015) was an American farmer, rancher, and politician. He served in the North Dakota House of Representatives from 1991 to 2009.

Born in Minot, North Dakota, Kerzman lived on a farm near Emmet, North Dakota and then moved with his family to another farm in Mott, North Dakota where he lived with his family. He graduated from Assumption Abbey High School in Richardton, North Dakota. Kerzman then went to Dickinson State University and North Dakota State College of Science studying mechanics. Kerzman was involved with the rural electric cooperative. From 1991 until 2009, Kerzman served in the North Dakota House of Representatives and was a Democrat. Kerzman died in a tractor accident on his farm near Mott, North Dakota.

Notes

1947 births
2015 deaths
People from Hettinger County, North Dakota
People from McLean County, North Dakota
People from Minot, North Dakota
Dickinson State University alumni
North Dakota State College of Science alumni
Farmers from North Dakota
Accidental deaths in North Dakota
Farming accident deaths
Democratic Party members of the North Dakota House of Representatives